The women's 50 metre rifle three positions competition at the 2004 Summer Olympics was held on August 20 at the Markópoulo Olympic Shooting Centre near Athens, Greece.

The event consisted of two rounds: a qualifier and a final. In the qualifier, each shooter fired 60 shots with a .22 Long Rifle at 50 metres distance. 20 shots were fired each from the standing, kneeling, and prone positions. Scores for each shot were in increments of 1, with a maximum score of 10.

The top 8 shooters in the qualifying round moved on to the final round. There, they fired an additional 10 shots, all from the standing position. These shots scored in increments of .1, with a maximum score of 10.9. The total score from all 70 shots was used to determine final ranking.

Russia's Lioubov Galkina fired an outstanding 101.4 for the gold in the rifle three positions finale, demolishing a new Olympic record score of 689.4. Italy's Valentina Turisini took the silver with a score of 685.9, while China's Wang Chengyi rounded out the podium with a bronze at 685.4. Kazakhstan's Olga Dovgun, who had led the field with a qualifying score of 588 earlier in the prelims, one point adrift of Galkina, slipped out of the medals with the most disastrous round of any of the eight finalists, getting just 96.9 points for a total of 684.9 to end up fourth.

Records
Prior to this competition, the existing world and Olympic records were as follows.

Qualification round

KN — Kneeling position; PR — Prone position; ST — Standing position

Final

References

External links
Official Results

Women's 50 metre rifle three positions
Olymp
Women's events at the 2004 Summer Olympics
Women's 050m 3 positions 2004